Urethral cancer is a rare cancer originating from the urethra. The disease has been classified by the TNM staging system and the World Health Organization.

Symptoms include blood in the urine, lump at end of penis, or bloody penile discharge.

Diagnosis is established by transurethral biopsy.

The most common type is papillary urothelial carcinoma. Risk factors suggested include prolonged irritations of the urethra due to urinary catheterization, chronic inflammation due to infection, radiation, diverticula of the urethra, and urethral strictures.

Signs and symptoms 
Symptoms that may be caused by urethral cancer include: 
Blood visible in urine.
Bloody urethral discharge.
Weak or interrupted flow of urine.
Urination occurs often, painful urination, inability to pass urine.
A lump or thickness in the perineum or penis.
Enlarged lymph nodes or pain in the groin or vaginal area.

Diagnosis 
Diagnosis is established by transurethral biopsy and histological findings. Bladder cystoscopy is performed to detect if there is simultaneous bladder cancer.

Histology
Types of urethral cancer include the most common type urothelial carcinoma, and others including squamous cell carcinoma, and adenocarcinoma. Melanoma and sarcoma are rare.

Staging
The World Health Organization classification of tumours of the urinary system and male genital organs (4th edn) was published in January 2016. Urethral cancer has also been classified by the TNM staging system.

Treatment 

Surgery is the most common treatment for cancer of the urethra. One of the following types of surgery may be done: Open excision, Electro-resection with flash, Laser surgery, Cystourethrectomy, Cystoprostatectomy, Anterior body cavity, or Incomplete or basic penectomy surgery.

Radiation therapy has also been used in some cases.

Chemotherapy is sometimes used to destroy urethral cancer cells. It is a systemic urethral cancer treatment (i.e., destroys urethral cancer cells throughout the body) that is administered orally or intravenously. Medications are often used in combination to destroy urethral cancer that has metastasized. Commonly used drugs include cisplatin, vincristine, and methotrexate.

Side effects include anemia (causing fatigue, weakness), nausea and vomiting, loss of appetite, hair loss, mouth sores, increased risk for infection, shortness of breath, or excessive bleeding and bruising.

Epidemiology
Primary urethral cancer is rare and contributes to less than 1% of all cancers. It is three times more common in men than women and its incidence rises after the age of 75.

Around half of affected people have locally advanced disease when they first present. 54–65% of cases are of the urothelial carcinoma type.

Prolonged irritations of the urethra due to urinary catheterization, chronic inflammation due to infection, radiation, diverticula of the urethra, and urethral strictures, may increase the risk of primary urethral cancer. Other risk factors include squamous cell carcinoma (SCC) and genital lichen sclerosus.

Prognosis 
A study of the National Cancer Database in the United States assessed cases of primary urethral cancer from 2004 to 2013, finding that median survival was 49 months with 5- and 10-year survival rates estimated at 46% and 31% respectively. A study of the RARECARE project, aimed at investigating rare cancers in Europe, estimated a 5-year relative survival rate of 54% in patients with cancer of the urethra.

See also
 Anterior urethral cancer
 Penile cancer

References

External links 

Rare cancers
Urological neoplasia
Urethra

de:Urothelkarzinom